John Charles "Jack" Carroll (14 September 1925 – 27 June 2018) was a rugby union player who represented Australia.

Carroll, a number 8, was born in Sydney and claimed 1 international rugby cap for Australia.

References

1925 births
2018 deaths
Australian rugby union players
Australia international rugby union players
Rugby union players from Sydney
Rugby union number eights